John Mary Caruana (born 21 June 1961) is a Maltese former footballer who played as a defender and made one appearance for the Malta national team.

Career
Caruana earned his first and only cap for Malta on 21 May 1988 in a 1990 FIFA World Cup qualification match against Northern Ireland. The away fixture, which took place in Belfast, finished as a 0–3 loss.

Career statistics

International

Honours
Sliema Wanderers
Maltese Premier League: 1988–89
Maltese FA Trophy: 1989–90
Maltese First Division: 1983–84

References

External links
 

1961 births
Living people
Maltese footballers
Malta international footballers
Association football defenders
Sliema Wanderers F.C. players
Maltese Premier League players